The Algibre River is a small river in the Portuguese region of the Algarve. The Algibre River is formed by the confluence of the Mercês (Ribeira das Mercês) and Benémola (Ribeira da Benémola) rivers close to the village of Querença in a small fertile valley. The area is characterized by many derelict sluices and dams that date back to the period of Arab occupation, during which the whole area was irrigated and agriculture was the predominating activity of this land. The river along with the Alte River, another tributary, becomes the River Quarteira after the two rivers conflux.

Description 
The Algibre is one of a number of small rivers in the central Algarve that make up the water ecosystem known as the Querença – Silves Aquifer System.

Gallery

References 

Rivers of Portugal
Rivers of the Algarve
Natura 2000 in Portugal